Africus may refer to:

 Africus (Roman mythology) or Lips (Greek mythology), the deity of the south west wind
Saint Africus, 7th-century French saint
Africus, the 1995 Johannesburg Biennale exhibition

Africa in Roman mythology